Allan deSouza (born 1958) is a Kenyan-born American photographer, art writer, professor, and multi-media artist. He is of Indian descent and his work deals with issues of migration, relocation, and international travel. He works in the San Francisco Bay Area, where he serves as the Chair of the Department of Art Practice at the University of California, Berkeley.

Early life and education 
Allan deSouza was born in Nairobi, Kenya, to Indian parents originally from Goa, India. His parents had left Goa while it existed as a Portuguese colony. During the upheaval following Kenyan independence in 1962 when he was age 7, his family emigrated to London, England. 

He was educated in both the UK and the United States. DeSouza attended Goldsmiths College in London, and earned his Bachelor of Fine Arts from Bath Academy of Art in 1983. He moved to the United States in 1992, participating in the Whitney Independent Study Program in New York and earning a master's in photography from the University of California, Los Angeles (UCLA) in 1997. 

He was married to artist Yong Soon Min in 1992, whom he has collaborated with on artwork.

Career 
He has written about contemporary art, contributing to publications such as the Los Angeles Times, X-TRA Contemporary Art Quarterly, Wolgan Art Monthly, and Third Text Journal, and has been invited as a lecturer to museums and universities across the globe, including Pratt Institute, Los Angeles County Museum of Art (LACMA), Seika University in Kyoto, Japan, and Moderna Museet in Stockholm, Sweden. 

DeSouza served as an Associate Professor and Chair of the New Genres department of the San Francisco Art Institute (SFAI) from 2006 until 2012, when he joined the faculty of the University of California, Berkeley as head of the Photography Department. In 2012, deSouza was invited to participate in the Rockefeller Foundation Arts and Literary Arts Residency at the Bellagio Center in Lake Como, Italy.

DeSouza's work has been featured at museums and galleries including The Phillips Collection in Washington, DC, Yerba Buena Center for the Arts in San Francisco, International Center of Photography (ICP) in New York, Centre Georges Pompidou in Paris, the Museum for African Art in New York, Moderna Museet in Stockholm, Sweden, and Talwar Gallery, which represents the artist, in New York and New Delhi.

Artwork 
DeSouza engages with issues of migration, relocation, and international travel in much of his artwork. His photoworks, texts, and installations examine geography, culture, and personal and communal identity.  Much of his work takes up themes and visual vocabulary of migration and diaspora; his series of photographic work, The World Series, for example, was created as a response to Jacob Lawrence’s The Migration Series. DeSouza is interested in movement, travel, dislocation, memory and time. 

For the photographic series The Lost Pictures, DeSouza placed a number of slides of old family photos around his house, deliberately allowing them to become scratched, faded, and covered in dust. Desouza’s work, in the words of one critic, “explores...both memory and photography as means of recording and preserving the past from aging, loss, displacement, and historical change.” Although often based in historical figures or events, his work also incorporates "fiction, erasure, re-inscription, and (mis)translation".

Exhibitions 
A list of select exhibitions by deSouza include:

Solo exhibitions

Group exhibitions

Performances 
2009: University of North Carolina, Chapel Hill, Bodies in Transit, Chapel Hill, North Carolina, US
2008: New Geographies in Contemporary African Art, presentation, Flyboy, Harvard University, Cambridge, Massachusetts, US
2003: Oboro Gallery, Will **** for Peace, collaboration with Yong Soon Min, Montreal, Canada

References

External links 
 

1958 births
Living people
Photographers from San Francisco
University of California, Berkeley College of Letters and Science faculty
Alumni of Bath Spa University
UCLA School of the Arts and Architecture alumni
Alumni of Goldsmiths, University of London